The 1908–09 İstanbul Football League season was the 5th season of the league. Galatasaray won the league for the first time.

Season

Matches
Galatasaray - Cadi-Keuy FC: 4-0
Galatasaray - HMS Imogene FC: 11-0
Galatasaray - Fenerbahce: 2-0

References
http://www.mackolik.com/Standings/Default.aspx?sId=15833
 Tuncay, Bülent (2002). Galatasaray Tarihi. Yapı Kredi Yayınları 

Istanbul Football League seasons
Istanbul
Istanbul